The South Africa men's national squash team represents South Africa in international squash team competitions, and is governed by Squash South Africa.

Since 1967, South Africa has won two Bronze medals of the World Squash Team Open.

Current team
 Thoboki Mohohlo
 Christo Potgieter
 Rodney Durbach
 Gary Wheadon

Results

World Team Squash Championships

See also 
 Squash South Africa
 World Team Squash Championships
 South Africa women's national squash team

References

External links 
 Team South Africa

Squash teams
Men's national squash teams
Squash
Squash in South Africa
Men's sport in South Africa